Colwellia arctica is a Gram-negative and facultatively anaerobic bacterium from the genus of Colwellia which has been isolated from marine sediment from the Arctic.

References

Alteromonadales
Bacteria described in 2015